Thomas John Gorence (born March 11, 1957) is an American former professional ice hockey right winger who played six seasons in the National Hockey League (NHL) for the Philadelphia Flyers and Edmonton Oilers. He featured in the 1980 Stanley Cup Final with the Flyers.

Playing career
A former University of Minnesota hockey player, Gorence played pro hockey for the Philadelphia Flyers (who drafted him with the 35th pick in the 1977 NHL Entry Draft) and Edmonton Oilers between 1978 and 1983. He was also a member of the United States national team at the 1981 Canada Cup and 1982 Ice Hockey World Championship tournaments.

Career statistics

Regular season and playoffs

International

External links
 
Tom Gorence's profile at Hockey Draft Central

1957 births
Living people
American men's ice hockey right wingers
Calgary Cowboys draft picks
Edmonton Oilers players
Hershey Bears players
Ice hockey people from Saint Paul, Minnesota
Maine Mariners players
Minnesota Golden Gophers men's ice hockey players
Moncton Alpines (AHL) players
Philadelphia Flyers draft picks
Philadelphia Flyers players
NCAA men's ice hockey national champions